Liu Chang may refer to:

 Liu Chang (Huainan) 刘长 (c.199–174 BC), son of Emperor Gaozu of Han
 Liu Chang (Southern Han) 劉鋹 (942–980), fourth and last emperor of the Southern Han 
 Liu Chang (tennis) 刘畅 (born 1990), Chinese tennis player
 Liu Chang (actor) 刘畅 (born 1993), Chinese male actor

See also
 Liu Zhang (disambiguation), romanized as Liu Chang in Wade–Giles